Amphipleura is a genus of diatoms belonging to the family Amphipleuraceae.

The genus was first described by Friedrich Traugott Kützing in 1844.

The genus has cosmopolitan distribution.

A newly discovered species, Amphipleura vavilovii, was found to be present in rivers of Laos.

Species:
 Amphipleura pellucida
 Amphipleura rutilans
 Amphipleura vavilovii

References

Naviculales
Diatom genera